Oscar Ismael Poltronieri (born 2 February 1962) is an Argentinian former soldier, who fought in the Falklands War in 1982. He is the only private who received antemortem the most important military distinction of Argentina, the Cross to the Heroic Valour in Combat, for his actions during the Battle of Two Sisters.

He was born in Mercedes into a poor family and started work as peasant when he was little, never finishing elementary school. In 1981, at 18 years old an illiterate Poltronieri was commissioned for military service. With only basic instruction, he was assigned to the Sixth Infantry Regime to fight during the conflict of the Falklands in 1982. In the last hours of the combat, while disobeying an order of withdrawal, he stayed with an FN MAG, stopping a British attack of the Scots Guards alone.

After the war, he worked temporary jobs and became a beggar due to the desmalvinización, the rejection of Argentinian society about the failure of the Falklands conflict and its veterans. Nevertheless, he was subject of recognition when his story attracted attention of the main media of the country like the newspaper Clarín . After that, the Argentine Army incorporated him as a civil personnel at Campo de Mayo base. 

He is subject of multiple tributes like a documentary about his life and songs, even as a symbol of Argentinian nationalism groups.

References 

1962 births

Living people